The men's 110 metres hurdles was an event at the 1996 Summer Olympics in Atlanta, Georgia. The final was held on July 29, 1996. Sixty-two athletes from 39 nations competed. The maximum number of athletes per nation had been set at 3 since the 1930 Olympic Congress. The event was won by Allen Johnson of the United States, the nation's 18th title in the event. Florian Schwarthoff's bronze was the first medal in the event for Germany, though East Germany had won gold in 1980.

Background

This was the 23rd appearance of the event, which is one of 12 athletics events to have been held at every Summer Olympics. Five finalists from 1992 returned: gold medalist Mark McKoy (then of Canada, now of Austria), fourth-place finisher Tony Jarrett of Great Britain, fifth-place finisher Florian Schwarthoff of Germany, sixth-place finisher Emilio Valle of Cuba, and seventh-place finisher Colin Jackson of Great Britain. McKoy, Jarrett, and Jackson had all been finalists in 1988 as well, with Jackson taking silver in Seoul.	Jackson was favored to return to the podium and possibly win; he had taken the 1993 world, 1990 and 1994 European, and 1990 and 1994 Commonwealth championships and broken the world record in 1993. His main competition was Allen Johnson of the United States, the 1995 world champion.

Cape Verde, Cyprus, the Czech Republic, Ghana, Haiti, Kyrgyzstan, Russia, Slovakia, Sri Lanka, and Uzbekistan each made their first appearance in the event. The United States made its 22nd appearance, most of any nation (having missed only the boycotted 1980 Games).

Competition format

The competition used the four-round format previously used in 1960 and since 1988, still using the eight-man semifinals and finals used since 1964. The "fastest loser" system, also introduced in 1964, was used in the first round.

The first round consisted of eight heats, with 8 hurdlers each (before withdrawals left one heat with only 6). The top three hurdlers in each heat, along with the eight next fastest overall, advanced to the quarterfinals. The 32 quarterfinalists were divided into four heats of 8 hurdlers each, with the top four in each heat advancing. One additional hurdler advanced due to being obstructed. The 17 semifinalists were divided into two semifinals of 8 hurdlers each (with one having an extra due to the obstruction); again, the top four hurdlers in each advanced to the 8-man final.

Records

These were the standing world and Olympic records (in seconds) prior to the 1996 Summer Olympics.

Allen Johnson set a new Olympic record with 12.95 seconds in the final.

Schedule

All times are Eastern Daylight Time (UTC-4)

Results

Round 1

Heat 1

Heat 2

Heat 3

Heat 4

Heat 5

Heat 6

Heat 7

Heat 8

Overall results for round 1

Quarterfinals

Quarterfinal 1

Jarrett's obstruction of Kaiser resulted in Jarrett being disqualified and Kaiser advancing to the semifinals despite not finishing the race.

Quarterfinal 2

Quarterfinal 3

Quarterfinal 4

Overall results for quarterfinals

Semifinals

Semifinal 1

Semifinal 2

Final

See also
 1992 Men's Olympic 110m Hurdles (Barcelona)
 1993 Men's World Championships 110m Hurdles (Stuttgart)
 1994 Men's European Championships 110m Hurdles (Helsinki)
 1995 Men's World Championships 110m Hurdles (Gothenburg)
 1997 Men's World Championships 110m Hurdles (Athens)
 1998 Men's European Championships 110m Hurdles (Budapest)
 1999 Men's World Championships 110m Hurdles (Seville)
 2000 Men's Olympic 110m Hurdles (Sydney)

References

External links
 Official Report
 Results

H
Sprint hurdles at the Olympics
Men's events at the 1996 Summer Olympics